PS Eleanor was a paddle steamer cargo vessel operated by the London and North Western Railway from 1873 to 1881.

History

She was built by Robert Stephenson and Company for the London and North Western Railway in 1873.

She ran aground on 27 January 1881 at Leestone Point, Kilkeel, Ireland and was lost. Within the year, the railway company had replaced her with a new paddle steamer of the same name, Eleanor.

References

1873 ships
Steamships
Ships built on the River Tyne
Ships of the London and North Western Railway
Paddle steamers of the United Kingdom
Maritime incidents in January 1881
Shipwrecks of Ireland
Shipwrecks in the Irish Sea